Esmailabad-e Korbal or Esmailabad Korbal may refer to:
 Esmailabad-e Korbal, Jahrom
 Esmailabad-e Korbal, Kharameh